The Edel Millennium is a South Korean single-place, paraglider that was designed and produced by Edel Paragliders of Gwangju. It is now out of production.

Design and development
The Millennium was designed as an advanced and competition glider. It can be fitted with thin cross-section lines to reduce drag for competition flying.

The models are each named for their relative size.

Variants
Millennium S
Small-sized model for light-weight pilots. Its wing has an aspect ratio is 6.37:1. The glider model is AFNOR Competition certified.
Millennium M
Mid-sized model for medium-weight pilots. The glider model is AFNOR Competition certified.
Millennium L
Large-sized model for heavier pilots. Its wing has an aspect ratio is 6.37:1. The glider model is AFNOR Competition certified.

Specifications (Millennium M)

References

Millennium
Paragliders